The Flower of Evil (Hangul:악의 꽃) is a manhwa by Lee Hyeon-Sook.

Summary
Se-joon and Se-wa are twins who are very close. In the public eye, Se-wa is an ice princess that cares only for her brother, to an obsessive extent. Se-joon, however, appears to be embarrassed by his sisters affection. When Se-joon starts dating Su-in, Se-wa's obsession with Se-joon becomes a desperate possessiveness that fractures their relationship. 

Se-joon and Se-wa meet a boy who introduces himself as an old friend, Sung-chan, who has changed his name to Gi-hoon. Se-wa becomes friends with Sung-chan, and gradually opens up throughout the manhwa. Se-joon's girlfriend discovers Se-joon's true feelings for Se-wa, and breaks up with him. Jealous, Se-joon starts harboring a deep hatred towards Se-wa who he feels has betrayed him, and towards Sung-chan who's stealing what Se-joon believes is his.

During a class reunion, Se-joon meets the real Sung-chan who resembles Gi-hoon but is clearly not the same person who has befriended Se-wa.

It is revealed that the twins were born with congenital heart defects, and Se-wa required a heart transplant for which she takes immunosuppressants. Se-wa's struggle for life or death caused Se-joon to realize what she means to him, and his possessiveness became dark and deep. He had subversively kept her secluded from others, so she wouldn't make friends other than himself. The donor heart that Se-wa received is revealed to have come from Gi-hoon's brother, and Gi-hoon believes that Se-wa stole his little brother's heart for her transplant. After his death, their mother committed suicide. 
When confronted, Gi-hoon tells them that although he initially approached her because of the transplant, he started to develop feelings towards her as their relationship progressed, but Se-joon chases Gi-hoon out of the house.

With his sister finally in his arms, Se-joon's possessive desire overflows and he commits the sin he feared the most: making love with his twin sister Se-wa.  The next day he goes to church to confess. Gi-hoon follows Se-joon and finds out about Se-joon's sin. He confronts Se-joon, who clubs him on the head and leaves him for dead, although Gi-hoon was brought to the hospital by a witness to the attack. Se-joon's fear that someone would take Se-wa away from him caused him to commit his second sin.

Thinking he has murdered Gi-hoon, Se-joon flees with Se-wa to their grandmother's house in the country. Se-wa tries to call Gi-hoon, but there is no answer. Her unstable heart is acting up, without her anti-rejection medications. Se-joon doesn't realize the seriousness of the situation and dismisses Se-wa's concerns. Se-wa starts to cough blood. Se-joon immediately rushes her  to the hospital, but to no avail. She soon quietly passes away. At the funeral of Se-wa, Se-joon meets Gi-hoon who is still recovering from his injuries. Se-joon is very afraid of what he might say or do but all he does is look deep into Se-joon eyes and say "This is all your fault". Distraught, Se Joon goes into shock and secludes himself from his family. His mother goes in to call him out to dinner only to find that he had slit his right wrist and in the other he carries a picture of him and Se-wa laughing happily together. The epilogue is closed with the story of the boy that was loved by all. In a flashback, Se-wa asks Se-joon if he would choose to be loved by all or loved by one, and he replies that he would rather be loved by one. However deep in his head he thinks, "But it is impossible because I-" The story ends and what he was about to say is never revealed. Fan discussion shows that most believes he was about to say "I love you".

Characters
Se-Joon
Se-wa's twin brother, very close to Se-wa, and obsessed with her, after witnessing her struggle for life after a heart transplant. He is considered as a handsome and gentle young man but he has a cold and manipulative personality.

Se-Wa
Se-Joon's twin sister who had a heart transplant as a child. A beautiful girl who is obsessed with her brother. When the rumors started circulating about a purported incest betwin twins in school, See-Joon rejected her advances and takes on a girlfriend. Dejected, she warms up to Gi-Hoon and becomes more out-going.

Gi-Hoon
A handsome classmate and friend of the twins, who pretends to be Sung-chan. He is drawn to the twins. 

Sung-chan
The realclassmate of Se-joon and Se-wa, who resembles Gi-hoon. Se-joon met him during a class reunion.

Su-in
A third year and therefore a senior (seonbae) at their school. Se-joon's girlfriend.

Soo-jin
Gi-hoon's ex-girlfriend who hurt Se-wa; she lost an eye when Se-joon attacked her in defense of his twin.

Mr Eun
Se-joon and Se-wa's father. Works as a doctor and owns a clinic.

Mrs Eun
Se-joon and Se-wa's mother. A caring mother.

Gi-hoon's father
Living with his son, he had already lost his wife and children.

References 

Romance comics
Manhwa titles
Daewon C.I. titles
2006 comics debuts